Amílcar Spencer Lopes (born September 8, 1948) is a Cape Verdean politician and was the 2nd President of the National Assembly from 1991 to 1996. He succeeded Abílio Duarte and was succeeded by António do Espírito Santo Fonseca.  After, he became Minister of Foreign Affairs succeeding José Tomás Veiga.  He had the position up to 1998 and was succeeded by José Luís de Jesus.

References

External links
 Biography at the National Assembly website (pdf)

1948 births
Living people
Cape Verdean diplomats
Foreign ministers of Cape Verde
Presidents of the National Assembly (Cape Verde)
People from São Nicolau, Cape Verde